The German television mystery music game show I Can See Your Voice premiered the inaugural shortlived first season on RTL as back-to-back pilot episodes on 18 and 19 August 2020.

During the ongoing COVID-19 pandemic, it was also known for airing pilot episodes involving audience without health and safety protocols implemented. Because of backlash from viewers, the show forced to halt production, bringing the first season ended prematurely, which is similar to the second season of Philippine counterpart.

Gameplay

Format
Under the original format, the contestant can eliminate one or two mystery singers after each round. The game concludes with the last mystery singer standing which depends on the outcome of a duet performance with a guest artist.

Rewards
If the singer is good, the contestant wins ; if the singer is bad, the same amount is given to the bad singer instead.

Rounds
Each episode presents the guest artist and contestant with seven people whose identities and singing voices are kept concealed until they are eliminated to perform on the "stage of truth" or remain in the end to perform the final duet.

Episodes

Guest artists

Reception

Television ratings

Source:

Notes

References

I Can See Your Voice (German game show)
2020 German television seasons
Television series impacted by the COVID-19 pandemic